Camp Edilberto Evangelista is a military installation of the Philippine Army in Cagayan de Oro, Philippines.

Background
Camp Edilberto Evangelista is a military base of the Philippine Army, and houses the 4th Infantry Division. Its scope includes Northern Mindanao and Caraga regions. The camp hosts the Camp Evangelista Station Hospital. The camp is named after Manila-native and civil engineer Edilberto Evangelista. 

The land where Camp Evangelista stands would be reserved for use of the Philippine Army way back on March 31, 1938 when President Manuel L. Quezon through Proclamation No. 265. The camp was initially referred to as Camp Bulua and adopted its current name in 1940.

Camp Evangelista was seized by Col. Alexander Noble, a mutineer, during the 1990 Mindanao crisis. 

In the 2017 Marawi siege, the camp would serve as a hub for munitions and equipment sourced from Manila.

In July 12, 2022, a fire and explosion hit the ammunition depot at the camp injuring three civiliansThe incident renewed calls to move the camp.

See also
Camp Evangelista shooting

References

Army installations of the Philippines
Buildings and structures in Cagayan de Oro